Luke Musgrave (born September 2, 2000) is an American football tight end for the Oregon State Beavers. He is the nephew of NFL and college football coach Bill Musgrave.

Early life and high school
Musgrave attended Bend Senior High School in Bend, Oregon. He was a member of their football, lacrosse, track, and ski racing teams. As a senior, Musgrave caught 31 passes for 563 yards and four touchdowns.

College career
Musgrave played in all 12 of Oregon State's games during his freshman season, catching two passes for 18 yards and making two tackles on special teams. He played in seven games with three starts in the Beavers' COVID-19 shortened 2020 season and had 12 receptions for 142 yards. Musgrave caught 22 passes for 304 yards and one touchdown during his sophomore season. He also blocked a punt and returned it 27 yards for a touchdown in a 42-34 win over Utah and was named the Pac-12 Conference Special Teams Player of the Week.

Personal life
Musgrave's father, Doug Musgrave, played quarterback at Oregon. His uncle, Bill Musgrave, also played quarterback at Oregon before playing and coaching in the NFL.

References

External links
Oregon State Beavers bio

Living people
American football tight ends
Oregon State Beavers football players
Players of American football from Oregon
2000 births